The Afghan racerunner (Eremias afghanistanica) is a species of lizard found in Afghanistan.

References

Eremias
Reptiles described in 1991
Taxa named by Wolfgang Böhme (herpetologist)
Taxa named by Mykola Szczerbak